Sevenscore is a hamlet on the B2048 secondary road about one mile (1.6 km) east of Minster-in-Thanet in Kent, England. It is in the civil parish of Minster-in-Thanet.

It is among, and associated with the other hamlet settlements in west Thanet.

Sevenscore Farm is a large presence in the hamlet and specialises in asparagus crops.